Leonardus "Leonid" Syttin (born 3 December 1892 in Vilnius, date of death unknown) was a Lithuanian sport shooter who competed for the Russian Empire in the 1912 Summer Olympics. In 1912 he finished 23rd in the trap competition.

References

External links
List of Lithuanian sport shooters

1892 births
Year of death missing
Lithuanian male sport shooters
Olympic shooters of Russia
Shooters at the 1912 Summer Olympics
Trap and double trap shooters
Sportspeople from Vilnius